Jimmy Monaghan (Irish: Seamus Ó Muíneacháin) is an Irish musician from Belmullet, Ireland. He has released music as a solo artist, and as a member of the anti-folk band Music for Dead Birds.

Music

In 2007, he formed Music for Dead Birds with drummer Dónal Walsh in Galway city. One of the band's first gigs was a live performance on Anocht FM from the Roisin Dubh in August 2007. Their debut album, And then it rained for seven days, was released in 2009 by the Irish record label Rusted Rail. This was followed by the independently released The Pope's Sister, a concept album about the influence of the Catholic church in Ireland, in 2011, Vitamins in 2014, and Pagan Blessings in 2018. 

He began releasing ambient instrumental music in 2011, with The Connacht Tribune writing in 2022 that; "Through five albums he has approached ambient, instrumental soundscapes with piano melodies, gentle guitar, percussion and field recordings – using his music to reflect the calm and space of the areas that inspire it." In July 2012, Psychonavigation Records released his debut solo album Seamus O'Muineachain. The Irish Times reviewed the album positively, calling it a "tremulous if tranquil success." To promote the album he performed at The Electric Picnic festival and Whelan's, Dublin. In 2013, his song Alone In Nature (Without Technology) was featured on an An Taobh Tuathail compilation released by RTE. In 2017 he produced and released his second solo album Cloves. In 2019, he released the album City of Lakes while living in Hanoi, Vietnam. In March 2020, KEXP premiered a track from his fourth solo album Blue Moon Set. The album received a positive review in Rockerilla magazine, and was featured on BBC Radio 6 Music. Several music videos were created for the album, including a video for Slow Closing Day by Irish experimental film-maker Maximilian Le Cain. In 2022, he released the albums Different Time Zones and Isthmus.

In 2012, he released an album with Aisling Walsh under the name Christian Bookshop. Hot Press wrote that the project was "an acoustic folk duo in the classic mode, with a decidedly lo-fi approach." Also during 2012, he played the drums for the Galway-based folk band Yawning Chasm.

From 2013-2014, he released a trilogy of lo-fi punk albums under the name The Crytearions. Irish website Thumped called the project "Uncompromising, entirely unpolished and, in places, not entirely pleasant."

Monaghan has stated that his early musical influences were Irish traditional music and nu-metal.

Personal life

Monaghan was born in Danbury, Connecticut, and moved to Ireland at the age of six. He is of Irish and Italian descent. 

As a teenager, he was an amateur boxer, winning four Irish national titles. He won a silver medal at the 2004 Four Nations tournament boxing for Ireland and received the Western People Sports Star of the year award the same year. During his time representing Ireland internationally he fought against the German amateur boxer Gottlieb Weiss.

In 2011, his radio drama Thumb was shortlisted for the RTÉ PJ O'Connor Award. In 2015, he appeared in a Maltese stage production of Butterflies Are Free, which ran at Saint James Cavalier in Valletta.

In 2016, an image of him cycling on the Aran Islands was used on an Irish post stamp promoting the Wild Atlantic Way.

Discography

 As Seamus O'Muineachain 

Albums
 Seamus O'Muineachain, 2012
 Cloves, 2017
 City of Lakes, 2019
 Blue Moon Set, 2020
 Different Time Zones, 2022
 Isthmus, 2022

EPs
 Stamford, CT. Circa 1941, 2014
 Blood Apple, 2015
 Unnamed Cafe, Hoang Hoa Tham, 2018
 Sycamore EP, 2021

With Music for Dead BirdsAlbums And then it rained for seven days, 2009, Rusted Rail
 The Pope's Sister, 2011
 Vitamins, 2014
 Pagan Blessings, 2018EPs Black Tides Falling, 2010
 Your Brand New Life, 2015 
 Nail & Tooth EP, 2017Singles "English Weed/What A Waste", 2015.
 "Summer in Suburbia/Untied", 2020.

As The CrytearionsAlbums The Crytearions, 2013, Dramacore
 I See What It Is And I Am Scared, 2013
 These Songs Hate You, 2015CompilationsThe Crytearions: Selected Recordings from the Album Trilogy'', 2016

Other
 Christian Bookshop, Owl & Hat Records, 2012
 Spain, 2016
 Korea, 2019

References

1988 births
Living people
Musicians from County Mayo
Irish male singer-songwriters
21st-century Irish male singers
Irish people of Italian descent